Enevo is a village in the municipality of Dobrichka, in Dobrich Province, in the northeast part of Bulgaria, about  west of the Black Sea.

References

Villages in Dobrich Province